West Harbour may refer to:

 West Harbour, Auckland, New Zealand
 West Harbour, Otago, a former borough centered on the Dunedin, New Zealand suburb of Ravensbourne
 West Harbour, Helsinki
 West Harbour, Hamilton, Ontario, Canada
 West Harbour GO Station, a commuter rail station operated by GO Transit in the neighbourhood
 West Harbour RFC, an Australian rugby union team

See also

 North Harbour (disambiguation)
 South Harbour (disambiguation)
 West Harbor, a waterfront food hall and park under development in San Pedro, Los Angeles, California
 Western Harbour